Giampietro Ribaldi (born 12 March 1997) is an Italian rugby union player, currently playing for the Pro14 side Zebre. His preferred position is hooker.

Zebre
Under contract with Top10 side Viadana, Ribaldi was announced as a Permit player for Zebre for Pro14 Rainbow Cup in 2021 and for 2021–22 United Rugby Championship season. He made his debut in the Round 1 of the Pro14 Rainbow Cup match against , coming on as a replacement.

International career
On the 8 December 2021, he was selected by Alessandro Troncon to be part of an Emerging Italy 27-man squad for the 2021 end-of-year rugby union internationals. On 26 May hw was called for the South African tour in the 2022 mid-year rugby union tests against Namibia and Currie Cup XV team.

References

External links
itsrugby.co.uk Profile

1997 births
Living people
Italian rugby union players
Zebre Parma players
Rugby union hookers
Rugby Viadana players